Ethan and Grayson Dolan (born December 16, 1999), collectively known as the Dolan Twins, are an American comedy duo who rose to prominence in May 2013 on the video sharing application Vine.

Early life and career
The twins are from the Long Valley region of Washington Township, Morris County, New Jersey.

Since their beginnings, the duo has accumulated over 6.4 million followers on Vine and 11 million subscribers on YouTube, and embarked on a world tour titled the "4OU" Tour in 2016. The duo was also involved in a Twitter ad campaign for the social network's new stickers feature. At the 2016 Teen Choice Awards, the duo won the awards for Choice Web Star: Male and Choice YouTuber.

On March 27, 2018, the two announced a hiatus from YouTube through a video on their channel entitled Bye For Now. In the video, they stated that they wanted to re-evaluate themselves creatively and focus on their lives outside of the platform. They later announced their return on May 1, 2018.

In June 2018, the twins formed The Sister Squad with fellow YouTubers James Charles and Emma Chamberlain. The four uploaded simultaneous videos on their YouTube channels on June 19, August 28, October 31, and December 25, 2018, and were featured prominently in YouTube Rewind 2018. The Sister Squad was nominated for a 2019 YouTube Ensemble Shorty Award.

Their father, Sean Dolan, died from cancer on January 19, 2019. He was fifty years old.

On October 8, 2019, they uploaded a sixty-minute video titled It's Time To Move On.... They explained the stress of their father's death, and that they intend to change the content of their channel and to a more flexible schedule.

On January 14, 2021. they uploaded a podcast titled We're Moving On From YouTube, onto their podcast chanel Deeper with the Dolan Twins.

Work outside of YouTube 
MTV's Total Request Live reboot added the Dolan Twins to the show's lineup as correspondents, and provide on-air hosting duties across platforms. It was announced in August 2018 that the twins had directed a music video for the Australian alt-pop group Cub Sport.

In February 2020, the Dolan Twins launched a weekly podcast, Deeper with the Dolan Twins, produced by Cadence13. It lasted until May 2021.

Awards and nominations

References

1999 births
21st-century American comedians
American YouTubers
American comedy duos
Comedy YouTubers
Comedy-related YouTube channels
Commentary YouTubers
English-language YouTube channels
Identical twin males
Living people
People from Washington Township, Morris County, New Jersey
Prank YouTubers
American identical twins
YouTube channels launched in 2014